Monsoon House is a Canadian radio comedy series, which aired on CBC Radio One in the fall of 2006 and returned for a second season in 2009, thanks to it being a hit with CBC listeners.  The second season aired in early 2009 after a reairing of the first season. The writer, Al Rae, is stand-up comic and also a writer and story editor for the CBC television series Little Mosque on the Prairie. The cast records their lines together in sets simulating the locations taking place, making the dialogue sound natural. The program is produced by Tracey Rideout.

The series stars comedian Russell Peters as Russell Page, an aspiring Hollywood film producer who ends up returning to work for his Indo-Canadian family's book publishing business after squandering his cantankerous father's money in an attempt to finance a comedy starring Tom Arnold as a pediatric surgeon.  He ends up helping the family's publishing company, Monsoon House, produce a biographical film about John Diefenbaker, based on their only hit selling novel, Hail to the Dief.

The cast includes Pamela Sinha as Russell's sister Sabrina, Sam Moses as their father Kesh, and Michael Riley as Trenton Harrison, a successful, womanizing novelist constantly trying to seduce Sabrina.  Recurring cast members includes Simon Rakoff as a script doctor, Rick Green as Milton Claymore, a comically unstable street poet who is Monsoon House's only client other than Trenton, as well as Shauna MacDonald, Carly Street, David Huband and Imali Perrera.

External links
 Monsoon House

CBC Radio One programs
Canadian comedy radio programs
Canadian radio dramas